Liffol-le-Petit is a commune in the Haute-Marne department in north-eastern France.

Athlete Pierre Colnard was born here.

Population

See also
Communes of the Haute-Marne department

References

Liffollepetit